A pitch or a sports ground is an outdoor playing area for various sports. The term pitch is most commonly used in British English, while the comparable term in American and Canadian English is playing field or sports field.

For most sports the official term is field of play, although this is not regularly used by those outside refereeing/umpiring circles. The field of play generally includes out-of-bounds areas that a player is likely to enter while playing a match, such as the area beyond the touchlines in association football and rugby or the sidelines in American and Canadian football, or the "foul territory" in baseball.

The surface of a pitch is most commonly composed of sod (grass), but may also be artificial turf, sand, clay, gravel, concrete, or other materials. A playing field on ice may be referred to as a rink, for example an ice hockey rink, although rink may also refer to the entire building or, in the sport of curling, to either the building or a particular team.

In the sport of cricket, the cricket pitch refers not to the entire field of play, but to the section of the field on which batting and bowling take place in the centre of the field. The pitch is prepared differently from the rest of the field, to provide a harder surface for bowling.

A pitch is often a regulation space, as in an association football pitch.

The term level playing field is also used metaphorically to mean fairness in non-sporting human activities such as business where there are notional winners and losers.

Fields of play in various sports

Field sizes

Game court 

Game court is one of the names for a multi-sport athletic space, typically constructed outdoors, where such games as basketball, volleyball, paddle tennis and other racquet sports, and up to a dozen more games and activities can be played. They are usually smaller than a regulation tennis (120' x 60')or basketball (84'x50')court, although there is no set dimensions or size for a game court. The game-court concept was popularized by Sport Court in the 1970s, and some generic references are made to game courts as 'sport courts', although that is a trademark of Connor Sport Court International, LLC. Game courts are often found in residential backyards, giving families and children opportunities for healthy recreation close to home. 

Game courts are usually constructed using a rectangular sub-base made from concrete or asphalt, then covered with an open-grid modular polypropylene (or similar) sports surface to improve safety. Most feature athletic equipment such as basketball goals, net systems for racquet sports, volleyball and badminton, lights for nighttime play, fencing or ball containment netting, hockey/soccer goals, lines or markings for various sports, and practice or training components can also be incorporated into the design.

Surface 
The surface of a game court—as opposed to simply playing on concrete or asphalt—is designed for safe play and to reduce injury. Many people have started to use suspended athletic courts to cover old athletic courts like tennis courts and basketball courts. The surface should provide appropriate traction for various types of sports and activities, as well as shock or force reduction to minimize overuse and stress injuries.

Game courts are typically custom-designed to the interests of the family or organization, and are versatile in enabling a wide variety of sports to be played in a relatively small space. Some activities played on a game court are enjoyable modifications of other sports (such as short-court tennis) that allow for similar skills to be developed as the 'regulation' game, but on a reduced-scale court size. A typical game court of  might include a basketball key and 3-point line arranged around a hoop, overlaid by short-court tennis or pickleball lines (which can also be used for volleyball or badminton) along the longer dimension.

Ball containment 
Game courts for private use will frequently be built with a high fence surrounding the surface to allow for containment of the ball used in play, and, if required, to prevent people from entering. Any of several materials have been used, including chain-link fencing, welded wire mesh fence, and fabric mesh or netting.

See also
 Line marker (sports)

References

External links

Rules and dimensions

Outdoor structures
Sports terminology
Sports venues by type
Playing field surfaces
Association football venues